Athelqueen was an  tanker which was built by Harland & Wolff Ltd, Belfast in 1942 as  Empire Benefit for the Ministry of War Transport. Postwar she was sold into merchant service and renamed Athelqueen and later Mariverda, serving until scrapped in 1961.

Description
Empire Benefit was built by Harland & Wolff Ltd, Belfast. She was yard number 1164 and was launched on 24 November 1942 with completion on 20 April 1943. Her GRT was 8,202, with a NRT of 4,761, and a DWT of 11,900.

Career
Empire Benefit was placed under the management of Dodd, Thompson & Co Ltd. She was a member of a number of convoys during the Second World War.

MKS 16A
Convoy MKS 16A departed Tripoli, Libya on 29 June 1943 and arrived at Gibraltar on 6 July.

HX 253
Convoy HX 253 departed New York on 20 August 1943 and arrived at Liverpool on 4 September. Empire Benefit was due to sail with this convoy but joined the following one, HX 254.

HX 254
Convoy HX 254 departed New York on 27 August 1943 and arrived at Liverpool on 12 September. Empire Benefit was bound for Milford Haven and Falmouth.

In 1945, Empire Benefit was sold to Athel Line Ltd and renamed Athelqueen. Her port of registry was changed to London. In 1955, Athelqueen was sold to Mariblanca Navigazione SA, Panama, as she was unsuitable for transporting molasses and due for an extensive refit. Athelqueen was renamed Mariverda. She was operated under the management of Chandris (England) Ltd, and reflagged to Liberia. On 11 February 1958, Mariverda ran aground in the Suez Canal during foggy weather. She served until 1961 when she was scrapped at Kure, Japan, arriving on 6 September.

Official Numbers and Code Letters

Official Numbers were a forerunner to IMO Numbers. Empire Benefit had the UK Official Number 168528 and the Code Letters BFJP.

Propulsion

The ship was propelled by a four-stroke Single Cycle Single Action diesel engine which had six cylinders,  diameter by  stroke. It was built by Harland & Wolff Ltd, Glasgow.

References

1942 ships
Ships built in Belfast
Ministry of War Transport ships
Empire ships
World War II tankers
Steamships of the United Kingdom
Tankers of the United Kingdom
Steamships of Liberia
Tankers of Liberia
Ships built by Harland and Wolff